Super Kabaddi League (SKL) is a professional-level kabaddi league in Pakistan. Its inaugural season was played from May 1 to May 10, 2018 in Lahore. This league follows a city-based franchise model. More than a 100 Kabaddi players from Pakistan and abroad were presented in the players' draft, which took place on 23 April 2018 in Lahore. International players from Sri Lanka, Iran, Bangladesh and Malaysia participated in the inaugural edition.

Draft
Drafting of the inaugural season took place on 23 April 2018, with each of the ten franchises given an opportunity to pick a roster of 10 players, which included 2 Platinum, 7 Gold and 1 Foreign player pick.

Opening ceremony 
The formal opening ceremony of the league took place on 1 May 2018 at Alhamra Cultural Complex in Lahore. Film actress-cum-director/producer Reema Khan was the host of the opening ceremony. Singers Nabeel Shaukat Ali and Sara Raza Khan performed during the ceremony.

This was the first time that a sports related event of such a scale had been organised in the country.

The event was open for all to attend. It was attended by people from all walks of life as well team owners, officials of the Pakistan Kabaddi Federation and many others. The ceremony included several performances, which included Bakhshi Brothers, who also sang one of the songs for Season 1.

Teams and locations

Broadcast
SKL was broadcast live on television. The broadcast partner was PTV Sports. In addition to the live telecast, the matches were shown on repeat the following day as well.

Final
Gujrat Warriors won the inaugural Super Kabaddi League after defeating Faisalabad Sherdils in the final game by 38-26. Gujrat Warriors' Tehseen Ullah was declared the Man of the Final. Faisalabad's captain Nasir Ali was declared the Player of the League. The winning team received a Rs. 1 million cash prize while the runners-up were given Rs. 500,000.

See also
 Pakistan national kabaddi team

References

External links
 

Sports governing bodies in Pakistan
Kabaddi competitions in Pakistan
Sports leagues established in 2018
2018 establishments in Pakistan
Professional sports leagues in Pakistan